Synaptics is a publicly owned San Jose, California-based developer of human interface (HMI) hardware and software, including touchpads for computer laptops; touch, display driver, and fingerprint biometrics technology for smartphones; and touch, video and far-field voice technology for smart home devices and automotives.  Synaptics sells its products to original equipment manufacturers (OEMs) and display manufacturers.

Synaptics invented the computer touchpad, the click wheel on the classic iPod, Android phones' touch sensors, touch and display driver integrated chips (TDDI), and fingerprint sensors.

History

19861998 
Federico Faggin and Carver Mead founded Synaptics in 1986. They used their research on neural networks and transistors on chips to build pattern recognition products. In 1991, Synaptics patented a refined "winner take all" circuit for teaching neural networks how to recognize patterns and images. The circuit uses basic physics principles in order to select the strongest signal from the different processors.

In 1992, the company used the pattern recognition techniques it developed to build the world's first touchpad for laptop computers that allowed users to control the cursor and click with no additional mechanical buttons. The pad was a replacement for trackballs and mice used at the time. By 1994, Twinhead and Epson America had adopted Synaptics' touchpad for their computers (Epson with the ActionNote), followed by Apple in 1995 and later by other computer manufacturers, including Compaq and Dell.

19992010
In 1999, Francis Lee took over as CEO. The company had an initial public offering in 2002. As adoption of the touchpad grew, Synaptics sought to integrate the technology with other products. In 2004, Apple debuted the iPod Mini and fourth-generation iPod, both featuring a scrolling click wheel that used Synaptics' capacitive touch technology. Synaptics also provided a similar but vertical click wheel for the Creative Zen Touch portable media player.

In 2005, Synaptics sensors were featured in the Samsung B310, the first mobile phone to use capacitive-touch technology. In October 2006, Synaptics provided a live demonstration of the Onyx, a concept smartphone with a color touchscreen enabled by its ClearPad touch controller technology. The Onyx's touch sensor could tell the difference between a finger and a cheek, preventing accidental inputs during calls. The company's touch technology was used in LG's Prada phone in 2007, which was the world's first mobile phone with a capacitive touchscreen. 

In 2009, Synaptics announced the development of the Fuse concept smartphone. It had touch sensitivity on the back of the phone, the ability to interact with the phone by squeezing, animated icons, a user interface sensitive to the phone's orientation and tilt, and haptic gestures.

2011present
In 2011, the company appointed Rick Bergman to succeed Francis Lee as CEO.

In 2012, Synaptics introduced the first pressure recognizing touchscreen, which allowed multi-finger and variable-force input. In late 2013, Synaptics acquired Validity Sensors, a fingerprint sensor vendor, adding fingerprint sensing technology to the company.

Synaptics is a founding member of the FIDO (Fast ID Online) Alliance and the Universal Stylus Initiative (USI).

Synaptics acquired Renesas SP Drivers Inc., a Japanese company specializing in chips that manage LCD displays, in 2014. The acquisition enabled Synaptics to combine touch and display driver technologies into a single "TDDI" (Touch and Display Driver Integration) chip.

In 2015, the company expanded into additional markets, including automotive, wearables and PC peripherals. In July 2015, Synaptics announced a unique “match-in-sensor” fingerprint authenticator for laptops and other devices that authenticates the fingerprint within the chip.

The company introduced its first optical-based fingerprint sensor in December 2016, which would allow the sensor to be placed under smartphones' glass displays rather than under a separate button. After improving the technology, the company sent it into full production a year later. In January 2018, the Chinese company Vivo announced a smartphone featuring Synaptics' optical fingerprint sensor. This was the world’s first full-production smartphone with fingerprint authentication directly in the OLED display. 

In July 2017, Synaptics acquired Conexant Systems, an Amazon Alexa partner that creates voice and audio software and silicon products for smart homes. At the same time, Synaptics acquired Marvell Technology Group's Multimedia Solutions unit, which creates video and audio processing technology. The two acquisitions were intended to aid Synaptics' expansion into the Internet of things (IoT) market.

In August 2019, the board of directors appointed Michael Hurlston as the new CEO. Under Hurlston's leadership the company focused on growing its IoT business, expanding from its focus on sensors on glass towards development of low-power sensors to IoT devices.

In July 2020, Synaptics acquired DisplayLink, the developer of software and semiconductors that connect visual devices to computers.

The company expanded its IoT portfolio through the acquisitions of Broadcom's wireless IoT business assets and manufacturing rights in July 2020 and DSP Group in December 2021. From the Broadcom acquisition, Synaptics acquired Broadcom's existing wireless IoT assets,  as well as the development team and two products on the roadmap. The company completed the acquisition of DSP Group, a provider of chipsets for VoIP, multimedia, and digital cordless applications, in December 2021.

Technology 
As of July 2017, Synaptics held 2000 patents for human technologies. Many Synaptics products are based on capacitive sensing technology, sensing the electrical properties of the finger(s) touching the sensor, as opposed to a resistive touchscreen . Synaptics also has optical sensing technology.

Products 

The company originally focused on developing touch technology products and later expanded into IoT technology. As of 2022, the company develops and markets products for connectivity, sensing, and processing, as well as touch and display drivers, focused on the IoT market. In addition to developing workspace technology such as docking stations, Synaptics' technology is used in devices including gaming systems, media systems, cars, and virtual reality headsets.
 
Its connectivity products include wireless connectivity, such as Wi-Fi and Bluetooth products, and technology such as its wireless device communications protocol, Matter, which enables devices to operate together regardless of their different wireless interfaces. Synaptics acquired DisplayLink in 2020, adding that company's hardware technology for docking stations and video conferencing, and software for graphics connectivity to its products. It also develops wired connection products such as converters for USB Type-C to HDMI or DisplayPort, for high resolution video display. 

The company continues to develop laptop computer touchpads, fingerprint biometric technology for devices including cell phones, and other types of touch sensors and display drivers. Synaptics has also developed sensors for multiple parameters, including temperature, magnetic, capacitive, and inductive sensors that can be integrated into devices such as video game controllers,  wearable devices such as earbuds.

The company develops a variety of types of chips, including low-power edge AI processors and system—on—chip (SoC) technology for devices, such as smart home wireless devices headsets, and for graphics connectivity for video displays.  It develops and markets sound processing chips for voice recognition, used in voice controlled devices, including far-field voice DSPs.

In addition to its processors, it also develops display driver IC chips for technology such as VR headsets.

See also 
 Alps Electric
 ELAN Microelectronics

References 

1986 establishments in California
Manufacturing companies based in San Jose, California
Companies listed on the Nasdaq
Computer companies established in 1986
Computer peripheral companies
American companies established in 1986
Semiconductor companies of the United States
Technology companies based in the San Francisco Bay Area
2002 initial public offerings